Ezdina Mir or Ezdine Mir is a Yazidi holy figure who was the father of Sheikh Shems, Fexredîn, Nasirdin, and Sejadin, making him the ancestor of all Şemsanî Sheikhs. According to Yazidi oral traditions, Sheikh Adi is said to have met Ezdina Mir when he first went to Lalish.

References

Year of birth unknown
Year of death unknown
Yazidi mythology
Yazidi history
Yazidi religion
Yazidi holy figures
Kurdish words and phrases